Abū aṣ‐Ṣalt Umayya ibn ʿAbd al‐ʿAzīz ibn Abī aṣ‐Ṣalt ad‐Dānī al‐Andalusī (October 23, 1134), known in Latin as Albuzale, was an Andalusian-Arab polymath who wrote about pharmacology, geometry, Aristotelian physics, and astronomy. His works on astronomical instruments were read both in the Islamic world and Europe. He also occasionally traveled to Palermo and worked in the court of Roger I of Sicily as a visiting physician. He became well known in Europe through translations of his works made in the Iberian Peninsula and in southern France. He is also credited with introducing Andalusi music to Tunis, which later led to the development of the Tunisian ma'luf.

Life 
Abu as-Salt was born in Dénia, al-Andalus.  After the death of his father while he was a child, he became a student of al‐Waqqashi (10171095) of Toledo (a colleague of Abū Ishāq Ibrāhīm az-Zarqālī). Upon completing his mathematical education in Seville, and because of the continuing conflicts during the reconquista, he set out with his family to Alexandria and then Cairo in 1096.

In Cairo, he entered the service of the Fatimid ruler Abū Tamīm Ma'add al-Mustanṣir bi-llāh and the Vizier Al-Afdal Shahanshah. His service continued until 1108, when, according to Ibn Abī Uṣaybiʿa, his attempt to retrieve a very large Felucca laden with copper, that had capsized in the Nile, ended in failure. Abu as-Salt had built a mechanical tool to retrieve the Felucca, and was close to success when the machine's silk ropes fractured. The Vizier Al-Afdal ordered Abu as-Salt's arrest, and he was imprisoned for more than three years, only to be released in 1112.

Abu al-Salt then left Egypt for Mahdia in Tunisia, the capital of the Zirids in Ifriqiya where he entered the service of king Yaḥyā ibn Tamīm as‐Ṣanhājī and where his son, ʿAbd al‐ʿAzīz was born. He also occasionally traveled to Palermo and worked in the court of Roger I of Sicily as a visiting physician. He also sent poems to the Palermitan poet Abū ḍ-Ḍawʾ. He died, probably of dropsy, in Béjaïa, Algeria. He is buried in the Ribat of Monastir, Tunisia.

Works 

Abu as-Salt wrote an encyclopedic work of many treatises on the scientific disciplines known as quadrivium. This work was probably known in Arabic as Kitāb al‐kāfī fī al‐ʿulūm. His poetry is preserved in the anthology of Imad al-Din al-Isfahani. His interests also included alchemy as well as the study of medicinal plants. He was keen to discover an elixir able to transmute copper into gold and tin into silver.

Astronomy 

 Risāla fī al-amal bi‐l‐astrulab ("On the construction and use of the astrolabe")
 A description of the three instruments known as the Andalusian equatoria.
 Ṣifat ʿamal ṣafīḥa jāmiʿa taqawwama bi‐hā jamīʿ al‐kawākib al‐sabʿa ("Description of the construction and Use of a Single Plate with which the totality of the motions of the seven planets"), where the seven planets refer to Mercury, Venus, earth, Moon, Mars, Jupiter, and Saturn.
 Kitāb al‐wajīz fī ʿilm al‐hayʾa ("Brief treatise on cosmology")
 Ajwiba ʿan masāʾil suʾila ʿan‐ha fa‐ajāba or Ajwiba ʿan masāʾil fī al‐kawn wa‐ʾl‐ḥabīʿa wa‐ʾl‐ḥisāb ("Solution to questions on cosmology, physics, and arithmetic").
 An introduction to astronomy.
 A Summary of Ptolemy's Almagest.

Music 

 Risāla fī l-musiqa ("Epistle about music") - a manuscript translated in Hebrew is kept in Paris

Medicine (pharmacobotany) 

 Kitab al-adwiya al-mufrad - this book know both by a 1311 Latin translation by Almado de Vilanova and a Hebrew translation by Yehuda Nathan is unique as drugs are organized not by alphabetical order of the medicinal plants they are made of, but by the part of the body they are used to cure.

Description of Egypt 

 Risāla al-misriyya (Epistle about Egypt) a report written for the Zirid prince Yahya, precious for its description of 13th century Egypt

Logic 

 Taqwim al-dhikr (assessing memory) a summary of Porphyry's Isagoge and the first four books of Aristotles' Organon. The manuscript has been translated in Spanish by C. Angel GONZALEZ PALENCIA.

See also
Roger I of Sicily
Ibn Jubayr
Muhammad al-Idrisi
Ibn al-Saffar

Notes
  (PDF version)

References

1060s births
1134 deaths
11th-century people from al-Andalus
12th-century people of Ifriqiya
People from Marina Alta
Alchemists of the medieval Islamic world
Inventors of the medieval Islamic world
Astronomers from al-Andalus
Astronomers of the medieval Islamic world
Medieval Egyptian astronomers
Physicians from al-Andalus
Mathematicians from al-Andalus
Philosophers from al-Andalus
Scholars from the Fatimid Caliphate
12th-century astronomers